The Baku gradonachalstvo was a municipal district (gradonachalstvo) based around the city of Baku in the Caucasus Viceroyalty of the Russian Empire. The Baku gradonachalstvo was formed in 1906 on the territory of the Baku uezd of the Baku Governorate following the Armenian–Tatar Massacres, until its disestablishment after the revolution of 1917. The area of the Baku gradonachalstvo corresponded to the Absheron Peninsula, located in easternmost present-day Azerbaijan.

Administrative divisions 
The police precincts of the Baku gradonachalstvo in 1917 were as follows:

Demographics

Kavkazskiy kalendar 

Notes

References

Bibliography 

Caucasus Viceroyalty (1801–1917)
History of Baku
Modern history of Azerbaijan
20th century in Azerbaijan
1900s in Azerbaijan
1910s in Azerbaijan
States and territories established in 1906
States and territories disestablished in 1917
1906 establishments in the Russian Empire
1917 disestablishments in Russia
1906 establishments in Asia
1917 disestablishments in Asia